Gavorielle Marcu is a right-handed Romanian former tennis player. His highest ATP ranking was number 204 achieved on 30 April 1975. He competed in the 1974 French Open, where he lost to John Yuill in the first round.

External links

Romanian male tennis players
Living people
Year of birth missing (living people)
Place of birth missing (living people)
20th-century Romanian people